Nedjeljko Zelic (born 4 July 1971), commonly known as Ned Zelic, is an Australian former footballer who played as a centre-back or defensive midfielder.

Club career
Zelic started his career in the old Australian National Soccer League, where he played with clubs Sydney Croatia and Sydney Olympic. In his junior years he played for Croatia Deakin.

Zelic spent most of the 1990s playing in Europe, most notably for Borussia Dortmund where he reached the UEFA Cup Final in his first season with the club, losing to Juventus Turin of Italy and won the German Bundesliga title in 1995. He had a brief stint in the Premier League for QPR, moving for a club record £1.25 million, which was beset by injury and discontent. After just 4 Premier League games for the West London club, he departed to Eintracht Frankfurt in Germany.

After only a few months he signed for AJ Auxerre of France. At Auxerre, he replaced Laurent Blanc who moved to FC Barcelona, and participated in the UEFA Champions League. In July 1996, Zelic was selected to play for a World All Star team vs. Brazil at Giants Stadium, New York City. The All Star team was coached by Euro 92 winner with Denmark, Richard Moller Nielsen and consisted of such players as Jürgen Klinsmann, George Weah, Marcel Desailly, Lothar Matthäus, David Ginola and Fernando Redondo. In 1998, Zelic decided to move back to Germany and went on to make 102 appearances for 1860 Munich in the Bundesliga.

In 2002, he moved to Japan to play in the J1 League where he stayed for two years and played under Dutch coaches Hans Ooft and Wim Jansen, winning the Japanese Cup with his club Urawa Red Diamonds. Zelic signed for FC Wacker Tirol of Austria in July 2004 and stayed there for one season.

A-League
In 2005, Ned Zelic agreed terms to a two-year deal as a marquee to captain the Newcastle Jets in the A-League, where he played out the whole season from central defence. The Jets finished fourth on the league table and lost to the Central Coast Mariners 2–1 on aggregate over two legs in the Minor Semi-final.

Zelic underwent arthroscopic surgery on his knee after the semi-finals. Several months later he decided to move back overseas and it was not certain if he would continue his career.

Europe
After being granted a work permit, he signed a one-year deal with Dutch side Helmond Sport in August 2006, working again with his former 1860 Munich teammate Gerald Vanenburg, who was coach there. However, he left Helmond after only two months due to knee problems and considered retirement.

In January 2007, Zelic joined Georgian club FC Dinamo Tbilisi on a free transfer, where he played under former Czech National Team coach Dusan Uhrin. He announced his retirement from football in May 2008, after winning the Georgian Championship with Dinamo Tbilisi.

He was selected in Four Four Two magazine's Top 25 Australian Footballers of All-Time.

International career
He has played for the Australia youth, Olympic and senior teams, but made himself unavailable in November 1999 after disagreements with coach Frank Farina. Zelic was captain of the Australian team that competed and finished 4th at the 1992 Summer Olympics in Barcelona.

Personal life
Ned Zelic attended Wanniassa High School in Canberra, ACT. Zelic is the older brother of former footballer turned actor Ivan Zelic and presenter Lucy Zelic.

Career statistics

Club

International

Honours
Australia
 FIFA Confederations Cup: runners-up 1997

Dinamo Tbilisi
 Umaglesi Liga: 2007–2008

Urawa Reds
 J.League Cup: 2003

Borussia Dortmund
 Bundesliga: 1994–1995
 UEFA Cup: runners-up 1992–93

References

External links
 
 OzFootball profile
 FIFA World All Star Team
 
 
 
 
 

1971 births
Living people
Soccer players from Sydney
Association football defenders
Association football midfielders
Australian people of Croatian descent
A-League Men players
Australian expatriate soccer players
Australia international soccer players
Olympic soccer players of Australia
Footballers at the 1992 Summer Olympics
1997 FIFA Confederations Cup players
National Soccer League (Australia) players
Sydney United 58 FC players
Sydney Olympic FC players
Borussia Dortmund players
Queens Park Rangers F.C. players
Eintracht Frankfurt players
AJ Auxerre players
Expatriate footballers in France
TSV 1860 Munich players
Kyoto Sanga FC players
Urawa Red Diamonds players
Newcastle Jets FC players
Helmond Sport players
FC Dinamo Tbilisi players
Expatriate footballers in England
Expatriate footballers in Germany
Expatriate footballers in the Netherlands
Expatriate footballers in Japan
Expatriate footballers in Austria
Premier League players
Ligue 1 players
Bundesliga players
Austrian Football Bundesliga players
Australian television presenters
J1 League players
Eerste Divisie players
Erovnuli Liga players
Expatriate footballers in Georgia (country)
Australian expatriate sportspeople in Austria
Australian expatriate sportspeople in England
Australian expatriate sportspeople in Germany
Australian expatriate sportspeople in the Netherlands
Australian expatriate sportspeople in Japan
Australian Institute of Sport soccer players
Marquee players (A-League Men)
Australian soccer players